Port-Louis is a commune in the department of Guadeloupe, on the northwest of Grande-Terre.

Geography
Port-Louis is situated in the north-west of Grande-Terre. Port-Louis is home to the Gaschet lake which flows from the Gaschet ravine towards the Caribbean Sea. The climate is tropical.

The settlements in the commune of Port-Louis include Beauplan, Beauport, Beautiran, Bellevue, Belin, Belthier, l'Ermitage, Fauvette, La Goguette, Lallanne, Monroc, Pelletan, Philipsbourg, Pichon, Pierre-Ferraye, Paul-Aubin, Pouzzole, Rodrigue, Saint-Pierre, and Sylvain.

History
The settlement of northern Grande-Terre began in the mid-17th century. The city was first known as Pointe d'Antigues then Port Louis, bearing the name of the king of France Louis XIV. During the French Revolution it was renamed Port Libre (meaning free port) before returning to its current name in the 19th century.

At the beginning of the 18th century the city was one of the first sugar ports of Guadeloupe. Gradually Port-louis was dethroned by Le Moule and Pointe-à-Pitre. In the 19th century, the Domaine de Beauport was one of the most important sugar factories in the French West Indies. It closed permanently in 1990. Nevertheless, sugar cane and fishing remain the main economic activities of the commune.

Demography 
Population censuses have been carried out in the commune since 1961 after Guadeloupe was made a French department in 1946. Since 2006, the population statistics have been published annually by the National Institute of Statistics and Economic Studies (Insee). For communes with less than 10,000 inhabitants, this population census takes place every five years, with the population figures for the intervening years being estimated. The first complete census study under this plan was completed in 2008.

In 2016, the commune had 5772 inhabitants, an increase of 4.17% compared to 2011.

Politics and administration

Administrative and electoral regions 
The commune belongs to the district of Pointe-à-Pitre and to the municipality of Petit-Canal since the municipal rezoning of 2014. Before this, it belonged to the municipality of Anse-Bertrand.

Since 2014, Port-Louis has belonged to the urban conglomeration of North Grande-Terre, which is made up of 5 communes and has 58 267 habitants (based on 2016 statistics). Victor Arthein has been one of its vice-presidents since its creation.

For the election of members parliament, since 1988 Port-Louis has been part of the second electorate of Guadeloupe.

Education
Public preschools and primary schools include:
 Ecole primaire Robert Narayanan
 Ecole primaire Beauplan Pelletan
 Ecole maternelle Bourg 2 Port-Louis
 Ecole maternelle Virginie Naudillon

Public junior high schools include:
 Collège Port-Louis

Public senior high schools include:
 LPO Nord Grande-Terre

Notable people
 

Mariani Maximin (1914–2011), politician

See also

 Communes of the Guadeloupe department
 List of lighthouses in Guadeloupe

References

Guadeloupe communes articles needing translation from French Wikipedia
Lighthouses in Guadeloupe
Communes of Guadeloupe